Kiri is a given name appearing in various cultures. 

In Cambodian or Khmer, "Kiri" (or alternatively spelt "Kiry") means mountain summit. 

In Māori, "kiri" means "skin", "bark", or "rind". 

In Finland, Kiri (male) name is listed in Finnish orthodox calendar. The name is a short version of Kyriakos (Saint Cyriacus the Anchorite.

 Kiri Te Kanawa (born 1944), New Zealand opera singer
 Kim Kiri (born 1985), South Korean comedian
 Kiri Baga (born 1995), American figure skater
 Kiri Davis (fl. 2000s), African-American filmmaker
 Kiri Hart, vice president of development at Lucasfilm who oversees the Star Wars franchise
 Kiri Pritchard-McLean (born 1986), British comedian

Fictional characters 
 Kiri Komori, character in Sayonara Zetsubō Sensei
 Kiri, character in Mortal Kombat: Conquest
 Kiri Minase, character in Never Give Up!
 Kiri Marialate, character in Divergence Eve
 Kiri te Suli Kireysi'ite (Kiri Sully), character in Avatar: The Way of Water

References